María del Coral Barbas Arribas (or Arriba) is a professor at the Universidad CEU San Pablo in Madrid, Spain who is known for her research on metabolomics and integration of chemical data.

Education and career 
Barbas has a Ph.D. from Complutense University of Madrid. From 2005 until 2006 she was a Marie Curie fellow at King's College London. As of 2022 she is a professor of analytical chemistry at the Universidad CEU San Pablo and is the president of the Madrid section of the Spanish Royal Society of Chemistry.

Research 
Barbas is known for her research on metabolomics, a field she was first introduced to while she was a Marie Curie fellow. Her early research centered on the analysis of vitamins and development of chemical methods to analyze compounds such as caffeine. Her subsequent research has developed methods to analyze organic compounds in pharmaceutical drugs and foods, and defined biomarkers for diseases such as leukemia and Parkinson's disease. She is also known for defining quality assurance protocols for metabolomics data analysis and establishing workflows to analyze metabolomics data.

Selected publications

Awards and honors 
The Analytical Scientist named Barbas to their 2016 Power List in recognition of her contributions to chemistry. In 2017, she was honored by Acta Sanitaria for her chemical research linking diabetes and obesity. In 2018, she received the International Award of the Belgian Society of Pharmaceutical Sciences.

References

External links 

Analytical chemists
Women chemists
Living people
Spanish scientists
Year of birth missing (living people)